Hoc may refer to:

 Head of Chancery
 Hellenic Olympic Committee, one of the oldest National Olympic Committees
 Hoc (Beowulf), a Danish King from Beowulf
 Hoc (programming language), a calculator and programming language
 Hypertrophic cardiomyopathy (Hypertrophic (Obstructive) cardiomyopathy), but HCM is the more common and accepted acronym for that condition
 House of Commons, a legislative body of elected representatives in various countries
 Hooked on Classics, an album of popular classical music
 Pointe du Hoc, a cliff in Normandy scaled by the U.S. Rangers in 1944
 House of Cards (disambiguation)
 Ho language, identified by the ISO 639 3 code hoc
 United States House Committee on Oversight and Reform, known as the House Oversight Committee
 Hoc (card game), the progenitor of a family of French card games using hocs or 'stops'

See also
 Ad hoc, a Latin phrase meaning a solution designed for a specific problem or task
 Post hoc (disambiguation)
 Propter hoc (disambiguation)